John Lively may refer to:
 John Lively (politician), member of the Oregon House of Representatives
 John L. Lively, American horse racing jockey
 John Lively, a victim in the Lively massacre